Sylvania is a hamlet in the Canadian province of Saskatchewan. Sylvania is home to Patrick McKenna, co-Star of The Red Green Show.

Demographics 

Notable people 
Patrick McKenna, co-star of The Red Green Show

References

Designated places in Saskatchewan
Organized hamlets in Saskatchewan
Tisdale No. 427, Saskatchewan